Konibodom District or Nohiya-i Konibodom is a former district in Sughd Region, Tajikistan. Its capital was Konibodom. Around 2018, it was merged into the city of Konibodom.

Administrative divisions
The district was divided administratively into jamoats. They were as follows (and population).

References

Former districts of Tajikistan
Sughd Region